This partial list of city nicknames in Hawaii compiles the aliases, sobriquets and slogans that cities in Hawaii are known by (or have been known by historically), officially and unofficially, to municipal governments, local people, outsiders or their tourism boards or chambers of commerce. City nicknames can help in establishing a civic identity, helping outsiders recognize a community or attracting people to a community because of its nickname; promote civic pride; and build community unity. Nicknames and slogans that successfully create a new community "ideology or myth" are also believed to have economic value. Their economic value is difficult to measure, but there are anecdotal reports of cities that have achieved substantial economic benefits by "branding" themselves by adopting new slogans.

Nicknames
 Hilo
 America’s Wettest City
 Orchid Capital
 Honolulu
 The Big Pineapple
 Pacific Diamond

See also
 List of city nicknames in the United States

References

Hawaii geography-related lists
Hawaii
Populated places in Hawaii